Berta Emilie Helene Drews (19 November 1901 – 10 April 1987) was a German stage and film actress. She appeared in more than 60 films from 1933 to 1983. She was married to actor Heinrich George. The couple had two sons, including actor Götz George.

Filmography

References

External links
 

1901 births
1987 deaths
Actresses from Berlin
German film actresses
German stage actresses
20th-century German actresses